The Aberdeen Stakes was an American Thoroughbred horse race held annually from 1913 through 1947 at Havre de Grace Racetrack in Havre de Grace, Maryland.<ref>[https://drf.uky.edu/catalog/1910s/drf1913042301/drf1913042301_2_9#q=April+24,+1917,+Aberdeen#fq= 'Daily Racing Form'' at the University of Kentucky archives April 23, 1913] Retrieved July 18, 2018</ref> Open to two-year-olds of either sex, it was run on dirt over a distance of four-and-a-half furlongs.

At one time an important event for juveniles, 1915 winner George Smith and 1919 winner Paul Jones both went on to win the Kentucky Derby.

The Aberdeen Stakes was last run in 1947, a year in which Saggy won and set a new World Record for the fourand-a-half furlong distance on dirt around one turn.

Records
 Time for 4.5 furlongs on dirt: 0:51.80, Saggy (1947) - New World RecordMost wins by a jockey: 2 - Willie Kelsay (1920, 1930)Most wins by a trainer: 2 - John P. "Doc" Jones (1926, 1946)
 2 - Clyde Phillips (1932, 1933)Most wins by an owner:'''
 2 - Harry P. Whitney (1917, 1922)
 2 - William Ziegler Jr. (1932, 1933)

Winners

References

Discontinued horse races
Flat horse races for two-year-olds
Horse races in Maryland
Recurring sporting events established in 1913
Havre de Grace Racetrack
1913 establishments in Maryland
Recurring sporting events disestablished in 1947
1947 disestablishments in Maryland